Uwe Scherr (born 16 November 1966 in Amberg) is a German former footballer who works as a scout for FC Amberg. He worked 12 years for FC Schalke 04 as chef scout, assistant manager of the Under-19 team and ans youth coordinator.

Honours
1. FC Kaiserslautern
 Bundesliga: 1990–91
 DFB-Pokal: 1989–90

References

1966 births
Living people
German footballers
Bundesliga players
1. FC Kaiserslautern players
FC Schalke 04 players
1. FC Köln players
Wuppertaler SV players
Association football midfielders
People from Amberg
Sportspeople from the Upper Palatinate
Footballers from Bavaria
West German footballers